Andreas Lill is a German Progressive metal drummer. He is best known for his work as the drummer for the band Vanden Plas.

Background
Andreas Lill was born November 3, 1965. As an early teenager he tried to learn to play bass guitar, but at 15 he started learning drums and the instrument stuck with him. He started a band called Exodus, and he recruited the now Vanden Plas singer and bandmate Andy Kuntz for vocals, and his brother Stephan Lill on guitar. The band, which has 3 live shows in Germany, evolved into the modern Vanden Plas, adding Torsten Reichert on bass and Günter Werno on keyboards. Away from Vanden Plas, Lill has been involved in many musicals, such as Jesus Christ Superstar, Rocky Horror Picture Show, Little Shop of Horrors, and others. He has also been involved in multiple side projects, such as Missa Mercuria, Abydos, Section A, Winterlong, and Ian Parry's Visions. His favorite bands are Van Halen and King's X.

Discography

With Vanden Plas
Colour Temple -(1994)
AcCult - (1996, acoustic EP)
The God Thing -(1997)
Far Off Grace -(1999)
Spirit of Live - (2000, live album)
Beyond Daylight -(2002)
Christ 0 -(2006)
The Seraphic Clockwork -(2010)
Chronicles of the Immortals: Netherworld (Path One) -(2014)
Chronicles of the Immortals: Netherworld II -(2015)
The Seraphic LiveWorks -(2017)

With Missa Mercuria
Missa Mercuria -(2002)

With Abydos
Abydos: The Little Boy’s Heavy Metal Shadow Opera About The Inhabitants Of His Diary -(2004)

References

1965 births
German heavy metal drummers
Male drummers
German male musicians
Living people